Nicholas James Samra (born August 15, 1944) is the eparchial bishop emeritus of the Melkite Catholic Eparchy of Newton in the United States. He is also Apostolic Administrator of the Melkite Greek Catholic Eparchy of Nuestra Señora del Paraíso in Mexico City since 2015.  Bishop Samra has written extensively on the subject of ecumenism and the Eastern Catholic Churches.

Biography

Early life and priesthood
Bishop Samra was born on August 15, 1944, in Paterson, New Jersey to George H. Samra and Elizabeth Balady Samra. His grandparents and his father were immigrants to the United States  from Aleppo, Syria. He was ordained a priest for the Eparchy of Newton  on May 10, 1970, and served as a pastor in Melkite parishes in Los Angeles, Chicago and New Jersey. Bishop Samra earned the B.A. at Saint Anselm College, Goffstown, New Hampshire, and a B.D. from St. John's Seminary in Brighton, Massachusetts.

Episcopate
On April 21, 1989, Pope John Paul II appointed Bishop Samra to Auxiliary Bishop of the Eparchy of Newton and Titular Bishop of Gerasa. Archbishop Joseph Tawil consecrated and installed him on July 6 of that year.   Bishop Samra served as Auxiliary Bishop and Protosyncellus until he retired on January 11, 2005, to devote himself to scholarly work.

In June 2011, the Synod of the Melkite Greek Catholic Church nominated him as Eparch of Newton to succeed Archbishop Cyril Salim Bustros, and Pope Benedict XVI appointed him to the position on June 15, 2011.  It was announced on August 20, 2022, that Bishop Samra will be succeeded by Bishop-elect Francois Beyrouti, elected on June 23, 2022, by the Melkite Synod.

On Friday, January 16, 2015, he was appointed by Pope Francis to serve also as Apostolic Administrator of the Melkite Greek Catholic Eparchy of Nuestra Señora del Paraíso in Mexico City, following the death of the former eparch until Joseph Khawam was appointed as successor on December 20, 2019.

Scholarly work
In October 2014, Bishop Samra presented "Eastern Catholicism in the Middle East Fifty Years after Orientalium ecclesiarum" at the conference "The Vatican II Decree on the Eastern Catholic Churches, Orientalium ecclesiarum - Fifty Years Later" organized by the Metropolitan Andrey Sheptytsky Institute of Eastern Christian Studies held at the University of Toronto.

An active speaker and author, Bishop Samra has written extensively on the subject of ecumenism, Christian leadership and stewardship. He has also published a multi-volume history of the Melkite Church and a book on the legacy of Archbishop Joseph Tawil.

Other activities
Bishop Samra is the past president of the Eastern Catholic Association of the U.S. Conference of Catholic Bishops.  Having celebrated his 75th birthday on August 15, 2019, Bishop Samra submitted his request for retirement to The Holy See, the acceptance of which was announced along with the announcement that the Melkite Synod had elected Fr. Francois Beyrouti to succeed Bishop Samra.

See also
 

 Catholic Church hierarchy
 Catholic Church in the United States
 Historical list of the Catholic bishops of the United States
 List of Catholic bishops of the United States
 Lists of patriarchs, archbishops, and bishops

References

External links

Official Website of the Melkite Church in the US.

Episcopal succession

American Eastern Catholics
American people of Syrian descent
American Melkite Greek Catholic bishops
1944 births
Living people
People from Paterson, New Jersey
Melkite Greek Catholic bishops
Saint Anselm College alumni